Lieutenant-General Sir Lionel Vivian Bond,  (16 June 1884 – 4 October 1961) was a senior officer in the British Army.

Military career
Bond was the son of Major-General Sir Francis George Bond (1856–1930), and elder brother of Major-General Richard Lawrence Bond (1890–1979). After attending the Royal Military Academy, Woolwich, Bond was commissioned as a second lieutenant in the Royal Engineers in 1903. He first saw action in military operations in the Mohmand Expedition of 1908. He also fought in Mesopotamia during the First World War.

Bond graduated from the first postwar course at the Staff College, Camberley in 1919. In 1922, he published a literary attack on Captain Liddell Hart's new theories on tank warfare, stigmatising them as "flapdoodle of the most misleading kind".

Bond was appointed Chief Engineer at Aldershot Command in 1934, General Officer Commanding Chatham Area in 1935, and Commandant of School of Military Engineering and Inspector of the Royal Engineers in 1938.

Defence of Singapore

During the Second World War, Bond took over from Major General Sir William Dobbie as General Officer Commanding Malaya in July 1939. Bond was aware that his predecessor had made an assessment on the war situation in Malaya, and was convinced with his findings that the Japanese would attempt to seize Singapore by attacking Malaya from the north through Siam. With only a small number of British force in his command, he knew he could not undertake the defence of the entire Malayan Peninsula. Bond decided on a strategy of close defence of Southern Johore, and the Singapore island.

Bond completed his term of office in Malaya on 29 April 1941. He retired from active military service soon after, and died in 1961.

References

Bibliography

Further reading
 Out-generalled, Outwitted, and Outfought: Generals Percival and Bennett in Malaya, 1941–42 / Lieutenant General John Coates (Retd), Australian Army Journal, Vol II, No. 1 (Winter 2004). pp. 201–214.
 Mackaness, George (ed.) Fresh Light on Bligh: being some unpublished correspondence of Captain William Bligh, R.N., and Lieutenant Francis Godolphin Bond, R.N., with Lieutenant Bond's manuscript notes made on the voyage of H.M.S. Providence, 1791–1795.
 Typescript Letter from Major General L.V. Bond, Commandant, School of Military Engineering and Commanding Officer, Chatham Area and Depot, Royal Engineers, Area Headquarters, Kitchener Barracks, Dock Road, Chatham to Lieutenant Colonel W. Lawrence Gadd, Rosherville Court, Gravesend, approving request to photograph glacis and moat of Spur Battery, Fort Amherst, Chatham. 19 February 1938 p. 51 (annexe)
 Activities of Australian troops before the fall of Singapore. The visit of Senator H.S. Foll, Minister for Information and others to Singapore. The opening of the Anzac Club and general views of the club. Scenes of the Sultan of Selangor, Major-General H. Gordon Bennett, Major-General L.V. Bond, Air Chief Marshal Sir R. Brooke-Popham, the Australian Actress Betty Bryant, Mr J. Williams Acting Director of the Department of Information, Mr T.S. Gurr Associated Newspapers Ltd.(film) Found in Australian War Memorial (ID No. F01157)
 Chapter 7: Operations Mounted By North Western Area 1942 – 1945(pp. 169 – 226), found in Joseph Wilson, David (2003) The Eagle and the Albatross: Australian Aerial Maritime Operations 1921 – 1971. Thesis University College, Defence Force Academy, University of New South Wales, Australia.
  Appreciation by the United Kingdom Chiefs of Staff on the Situation in the Far East, August 1940 — The Secretary of State for Dominion Affairs to the High Commissioner for the United Kingdom (Wellington), found in Documents Relating to New Zealand's Participation in the Second World War 1939–45: Volume III. the New Zealand Electronic Text Centre, Victoria University of Wellington.
Generals of World War II

|-
 

1884 births
1961 deaths
British Army generals of World War II
Royal Engineers officers
Knights Commander of the Order of the British Empire
Companions of the Order of the Bath
Military of Singapore under British rule
Graduates of the Staff College, Camberley
Freemasons of the United Grand Lodge of England
British Army personnel of World War I
British Army lieutenant generals
Graduates of the Royal Military Academy, Woolwich
Military personnel from Aldershot